The Coxcomb is an early Jacobean era stage play, a comedy written by Francis Beaumont and John Fletcher. It was initially published in the first Beaumont and Fletcher folio of 1647.

Date and performance
Scholars date the play to c. 1608–10, based on contemporary allusions and availability of sources. (It has been argued that one of the play's sources was the "Curious Impertinent" episode in Don Quixote, which was published in French translation in 1608, that translation being the playwrights' source. Ben Jonson refers to the play in The Alchemist in 1610.) The Coxcomb was performed at Court early in November 1612 by the Children of the Queen's Revels.

The play's text in the second Beaumont and Fletcher folio of 1679 provides a cast list for one production, a list that cites Nathan Field, Joseph Taylor, Giles Gary, Emanuel Read, Richard Allen, Hugh Atawell, Robert Benfield, and William Barkstead. This combination of personnel matches not the Queen's Revels Children but the Lady Elizabeth's Men. The former company combined with the latter for a time in 1613. The children's troupe later passed out of existence, leaving some of its plays, including The Coxcomb, behind with the Lady Elizabeth's company.

The play then passed into the possession of the King's Men, who acted it at Court on 5 March 1622, and on 17 November 1636.

Authorship
Cyrus Hoy, in his survey of authorship problems in the canon of Fletcher and his collaborators, provided this breakdown between the respective shares of Beaumont and Fletcher:

Beaumont — Act I, scene 4; Act II, 4; Act IV, 1, 3, and 7; Act V;
Fletcher — Act I, scenes 1-3 and 5; Act II, 1 and 3; Act III, 1 and 2; Act IV, 2, 4-6, and 8;
Beaumont and Fletcher — Act I, scene 6; Act II, 2; Act III, 3.

Critics have long recognized that the existing text is a revised version of the Beaumont and Fletcher original, likely done for one of the King's Men's revivals. The favorite candidate for the reviser is Philip Massinger, a major participant in Fletcher's canon; but William Rowley has also been considered. If the revision was done for the 1636 revival, as some believe, Rowley would be eliminated, since he died a decade earlier.

After 1642
Along with many other plays in Fletcher's canon, The Coxcomb was revived during the Restoration era; it proved popular, and was reprinted in a single-play edition in 1718. The play is one of the relatively few Beaumont/Fletcher works given a performance in later centuries; it was acted by the Elizabethan Stage Society in the Hall of the Inner Temple on 10 February 1898 – a production reviewed by George Bernard Shaw.

References

English Renaissance plays
1600s plays
Plays by Francis Beaumont
Plays by John Fletcher (playwright)
Plays by Beaumont and Fletcher